In the 2012–13 season of the basketball Turkish 2nd Division (TB2L), Uşak Sportif finished on top of the regular season league standings, but in the playoffs between the top 8 teams, Trabzonspor Basketball won the championship.

Regular season

League table

{| class="wikitable sortable" 
|- style="background:#2f4f4f"
!width=30 style="text-align:center" | Pos
!width=150 style="text-align:center" | Club
!width=30 styl="text-align:center" | Pld
!width=30 style="text-align:center" | W
!width=30 style="text-align:center" | L
!width=30 style="text-align:center" | PF
!width=30 style="text-align:center" | PA
!width=30 style="text-align:center" | Avg
!width=30 style="text-align:center" | Pts
!Qualification or Relegation
|- style="background:#dfd"
| 1 || Mackolik.com Uşak Univ.
| style="text-align:center" | 34|| style="text-align:center" | 26 || style="text-align:center" | 8 || style="text-align:center" | 2663 || style="text-align:center" | 2407 || style="text-align:center" | 1.1063 || style="text-align:center" | 60 
| rowspan=8 style="text-align:center"|Qualified for the Playoffs
|- style="background:#dfd"
| 2 || Torku Selçuk Üniversitesi
| style="text-align:center" | 34 || style="text-align:center" | 24 || style="text-align:center" | 10 || style="text-align:center" | 2687 || style="text-align:center" | 2375 || style="text-align:center" | 1.1313 || style="text-align:center" | 58
|- style="background:#dfd"
| 3 || Yeşilgiresun Belediye
| style="text-align:center" | 34 || style="text-align:center" | 24 || style="text-align:center" | 10 || style="text-align:center" | 2680 || style="text-align:center" | 2506 || style="text-align:center" | 1.0694 || style="text-align:center" | 58
|- style="background:#dfd"
| 4 || Akhisar Belediyespor
| style="text-align:center" | 34 || style="text-align:center" | 22 || style="text-align:center" | 12 || style="text-align:center" | 2569 || style="text-align:center" | 2435 || style="text-align:center" | 1.0550 || style="text-align:center" | 56
|- style="background:#dfd"
| 5 || Maliye Milli Piyango
| style="text-align:center" | 34 || style="text-align:center" | 22 || style="text-align:center" | 12 || style="text-align:center" | 2875 || style="text-align:center" | 2779 || style="text-align:center" | 1.0345 || style="text-align:center" | 56
|- style="background:#dfd"
| 6 || Darüşşafaka
| style="text-align:center" | 34 || style="text-align:center" | 21 || style="text-align:center" | 13 || style="text-align:center" | 2686 || style="text-align:center" | 2495 || style="text-align:center" | 1.0765 || style="text-align:center" | 55
|- style="background:#dfd"
| 7 || Trabzonspor Basketball
| style="text-align:center" | 34 || style="text-align:center" | 21 || style="text-align:center" | 13 || style="text-align:center" | 2515 || style="text-align:center" | 2348 || style="text-align:center" | 1.0711 || style="text-align:center" | 55
|- style="background:#dfd"
| 8 || Best Balıkesir Basketbol
| style="text-align:center" | 34 || style="text-align:center" | 19 || style="text-align:center" | 15 || style="text-align:center" | 2375 || style="text-align:center" | 2389 || style="text-align:center" | 0.9941 || style="text-align:center" | 53
|- style="background:"
| 9 || Bandırma Kırmızı
| style="text-align:center" | 34 || style="text-align:center" | 17 || style="text-align:center" | 17 || style="text-align:center" | 2429 || style="text-align:center" | 2410 || style="text-align:center" | 1.0078 || style="text-align:center" | 51
|- style="background:"
| 10 || Vestel
| style="text-align:center" | 34 || style="text-align:center" | 17 || style="text-align:center" | 17 || style="text-align:center" | 2558 || style="text-align:center" | 2510 || style="text-align:center" | 1.0191 || style="text-align:center" | 51
|- style="background:"
| 11 || İstanbul BŞB.
| style="text-align:center" | 34 || style="text-align:center" | 15 || style="text-align:center" | 19 || style="text-align:center" | 2577 || style="text-align:center" | 2655 || style="text-align:center" | 0.9706 || style="text-align:center" | 49
|- style="background:"
| 12 || Pİ Koleji
| style="text-align:center" | 34 || style="text-align:center" | 15 || style="text-align:center" | 19 || style="text-align:center" | 2574 || style="text-align:center" | 2690 || style="text-align:center" | 0.9568 || style="text-align:center" | 49
|- style="background:"
| 13 || Final Gençlik
| style="text-align:center" | 34 || style="text-align:center" | 15 || style="text-align:center" | 19 || style="text-align:center" | 2626 || style="text-align:center" | 2701 || style="text-align:center" | 0.9722 || style="text-align:center" | 49
|- style="background:"
| 14 || Başkent Gençlik
| style="text-align:center" | 34 || style="text-align:center" | 14 || style="text-align:center" | 20 || style="text-align:center" | 2419 || style="text-align:center" | 2520 || style="text-align:center" | 0.9599 || style="text-align:center" | 48
|- style="background:"
| 15 || Gelişim Koleji
| style="text-align:center" | 34 || style="text-align:center" | 13 || style="text-align:center" | 21 || style="text-align:center" | 2512 || style="text-align:center" | 2554 || style="text-align:center" | 0.9835 || style="text-align:center" | 47
|- style="background:#fdd"
| 16 || Pertevniyal
| style="text-align:center" | 34 || style="text-align:center" | 13 || style="text-align:center" | 21 || style="text-align:center" | 2493 || style="text-align:center" | 2525 || style="text-align:center" | 0.9873 || style="text-align:center" | 47
| rowspan=3 style="text-align:center"|Relegation to TB3L
|-style="background:#fdd"
| 17 || İstanbulspor
| style="text-align:center" | 34 || style="text-align:center" | 5 || style="text-align:center" | 29 || style="text-align:center" | 2110 || style="text-align:center" | 2536 || style="text-align:center" | 0.8320 || style="text-align:center" | 38
|- style="background:#fdd"
| 18 || İzmir BŞB
| style="text-align:center" | 34 || style="text-align:center" | 3 || style="text-align:center" | 31 || style="text-align:center" | 2294 || style="text-align:center" | 2807 || style="text-align:center" | 0.8172 || style="text-align:center" | 37

Playoffs

Turkish Basketball First League seasons
First
Turkish